The Undertakers could refer to:

 The Undertakers (band)
 The Undertakers (The Avengers)
 "The Undertakers", short story from The Second Jungle Book